This is a list of the National Register of Historic Places listings in Sheboygan County, Wisconsin. It is intended to provide a comprehensive listing of entries in the National Register of Historic Places that are located in Sheboygan County, Wisconsin.  The locations of National Register properties for which the latitude and longitude coordinates are included below may be seen in a map.

There are 62 properties and districts listed on the National Register in the county.

Current listings

ABIAH (schooner) Shipwreck,
13.1 mi. northeast of the Sheboygan Harbor Lighthouse in L. Michigan,
Haven vicinity, MP100007799,
LISTED, 6/16/2022

|}

See also
List of National Historic Landmarks in Wisconsin
National Register of Historic Places listings in Wisconsin
Listings in neighboring counties: Calumet, Fond du Lac, Manitowoc, Ozaukee, Washington

References

Sheboygan